Yuangang Station is a station of Line 7 on the Guangzhou Metro. The station is situated under Xingnan Avenue, located in Panyu District, Guangzhou. It began operations on 28 December 2016.

Station layout

Exits
Yuangang station currently has five exits, and exit F is under construction.

History
When Line 7 was originally planned, there were two stations situated under Xingnan Avenue--Guantang Station and Jingkeng Station. To accommodate the construction of the Nanda Highway, Line 7 in the Xingnan Avenue section had to lay under the north side of the road, so the original Guantang station did not have enough space to build, and then it merged with the Jinkeng station and moved to the current location.

On November 28, 2013, the station began construction. In July 2014, the station was formally renamed as Yuangang Station. The main structure of the station was completed in early August 2015, and it opened on December 28, 2016.

References

Railway stations in China opened in 2016
Guangzhou Metro stations in Panyu District